Nizhnyaya Kichuga is a rural locality (a village) in Strelenskoye Rural Settlement, Velikoustyugsky District, Vologda Oblast, Russia. The population was 2 as of 2002.

Geography 
Nizhnyaya Kichuga is located 52 km southwest of Veliky Ustyug (the district's administrative centre) by road. Verkhnyaya Kichuga is the nearest rural locality.

References 

Rural localities in Velikoustyugsky District